Jang Yun-ho (born 4 March 1961) is a South Korean former cyclist, who currently works as the team manager for UCI Continental team . He competed in the team time trial event at the 1984 Summer Olympics.

His sons Jang Sun-jae and Jang Chan-jae are also cyclists.

References

External links
 

1961 births
Living people
South Korean male cyclists
Olympic cyclists of South Korea
Cyclists at the 1984 Summer Olympics
Place of birth missing (living people)
Asian Games medalists in cycling
Cyclists at the 1982 Asian Games
Cyclists at the 1986 Asian Games
Asian Games gold medalists for South Korea
Asian Games bronze medalists for South Korea
Medalists at the 1982 Asian Games
Medalists at the 1986 Asian Games
20th-century South Korean people
21st-century South Korean people